Arjun Kumar Ghatani is a Sikkim Democratic Front politician from Sikkim, India. He was elected in Sikkim Legislative Assembly election 2014 from Salghari-Zoom constituency as candidate of the front. He was minister of Healthcare, Human Services & Family Welfare and Information & Public Relation (IPR) in Pawan Chamling fifth ministry from 2014 to 2019.

References 

Living people
Sikkim MLAs 2014–2019
Sikkim Democratic Front politicians
Year of birth missing (living people)
People from Gyalshing district